Oliver Damgaard Hald (born 20 December 1999) is a Danish cricketer who plays for the Denmark national team. In May 2019, he was named in Denmark's squad for a five-match series against Leinster Lightning in Ireland, in preparation for the Regional Finals of the 2018–19 ICC T20 World Cup Europe Qualifier tournament in Guernsey. The same month, he was named in Denmark's squad for the Regional Finals qualification tournament. He made his Twenty20 International (T20I) debut for Denmark, against Jersey, on 16 June 2019.

In August 2019, he was named in Denmark's squad for the 2019 Malaysia Cricket World Cup Challenge League A tournament. He made his List A debut for Denmark, against Malaysia, in the Cricket World Cup Challenge League A tournament on 16 September 2019.

References

External links
 

1999 births
Living people
Danish cricketers
Denmark Twenty20 International cricketers
People from Herning Municipality
Sportspeople from the Central Denmark Region